Mehboob Tunio is an old village situated in Deh Dhori Pir Bux, Nau Tharo Union Council of Taluka Miro Khan district Kamber in Sindh, Pakistan. This village was founded during Mughal rule by people of Tunio caste migrated from Nari, Qalat State.

References

Villages in Sindh